Slepotice is a municipality and village in Pardubice District in the Pardubice Region of the Czech Republic. It has about 400 inhabitants.

Administrative parts
Villages of Bělešovice, Lipec and Nové Holešovice are administrative parts of Slepotice.

References

External links

Villages in Pardubice District